Station to Station is the 2015 experimental film of Doug Aitken's 2013 "Nomadic Happening", the film is made up of 62 one-minute films. It was distributed internationally in 2015 following its release at the Sundance Film Festival.

References

External links

2015 drama films
2015 films
American drama films
2010s English-language films
2010s American films